List of 1900-1930 publications on Boxer Rebellion is a list of Chinese language publications on the nature of Boxer Rebellion during the early 20th century. The list includes  pamphlets, books, local county journals, and other publications.

Books
1900 West Hunt Record (Chinese:《庚子西狩丛谈》) Author: Wu Yong (Chinese:吴永)
Memoir of life in Hangzhou (Chinese:《杭居杂忆》) Author:Wang Shosoon (Chinese:王守恂)
1900 National Upheaval (Chinese:《庚子国变记》) Author: Li Xiseng(1864-1905) (Chinese:李希圣)
1900 Peking Records of Awards and Compensation (Chinese: 庚子京师褒恤录) Author:Wang Sosoon (Chinese: 王守恂)
Boxer Bandits Records (Chinese:拳匪纪略) Author:Chiao Qiseng (Chinese:侨析生) 出版社：上洋书局, 清光绪29年(1903) Date of publication:1903
Tianjin Boxer Bandits Upheaval Records (Chinese:《天津拳匪变乱记事》) Author:Liu Mengyang, (Chinese:刘孟扬) 1901 publication 刘孟扬
East of Peking Military actions against Bandits telegram records (Chinese:《直东剿匪电存》) 1907 publication
Boxer Bandits Eye witness records (Chinese:《拳匪闻见录》) 1911 publication
Boxer Bandits led to Disaster (Chinese:《拳匪之祸首》) Author: Anonymous, pen name: Ruo Xu (Chinese:若虚) October 1917

County journal
Chian An County Journal (Chinese:《迁安县志 》) Hebei (Chinese:直隶)
Sha He County Journal (Chinese:《沙河县志 》) Hebei (Chinese:直隶)
Xin Xian County Journal (Chinese:《新绛县志》) Shanxi (Chinese:山西)
Qing Ping County Journal (Chinese:《清平县志 》) Shandong (Chinese:山东)
Liao Yang County Journal (Chinese:《辽阳县志 》) Liaoning (Chinese:辽宁)
Kai Yan County Journal (Chinese:《开原县志 》) Liaoning (Chinese:辽宁)

References

Publications
1900 in China